Top seeds Wesley Koolhof and Matwé Middelkoop won the title, beating Gero Kretschmer and Alexander Satschko 6–3, 7–6(7–1)

Seeds

Draw

References
 Main Draw

Doubles
KPN Bangkok Open II - Doubles
 in Thai tennis